Robert Bloch (26 April 18887 March 1984) was a French racing driver who, along with André Rossignol, won the 1926 24 Hours of Le Mans for French manufacturer Lorraine-Dietrich.

Career

Bloch, with co-driver Édouard Brisson, finished the race second overall behind the factory Bentley team.

Bloch also competed in the 1925 24 Hours of Spa, finishing fifth overall, and the 1927 Coppa Florio, finishing 12th overall and third in class.

Racing record

Complete 24 Hours of Le Mans results

External links 
Robert Bloch at racingsportscars.com.

1888 births
1984 deaths
French racing drivers
24 Hours of Le Mans drivers
24 Hours of Le Mans winning drivers